Juddville is an unincorporated community in the town of Gibraltar, in Door County, United States. It is located along Wisconsin Highway 42 north of Egg Harbor. Road signs stating "Juddville unincorporated" were erected in 1973 due to local support for marking the area.

Gallery

Notes

External links
 juddville.org, Juddville, Wisconsin: The History of a Small Door County Community
 Juddville Rd and State Highway 42, Northwest Corner, property listing on the Wisconsin Historical Society database

Unincorporated communities in Wisconsin
Unincorporated communities in Door County, Wisconsin